Anna Shaposhnikova  (born 13 February 1999) is a Russian handball player for HC Astrakhanochka and the Russian national team.

She was selected to represent Russia at the 2017 World Women's Handball Championship.

References

1999 births
Living people
Russian female handball players
Sportspeople from Astrakhan